The 63rd Texas Legislature met from January 9, 1973, to May 28, 1973, in regular session, and again in a special called session from December 18, 1973, to December 20, 1973. All members present during this session were elected in the 1972 general elections.

Sessions
Regular Session: January 9, 1973 - May 28, 1973
Called Session: December 18, 1973 - December 20, 1973

Party summary

Senate

House

Officers

Senate
 Lieutenant Governor: William P. Hobby, Jr., Democrat
 President Pro Tempore (regular session): Oscar Mauzy, Democrat
 President Pro Tempore (called session): Max Sherman, Democrat

House
 Speaker of the House: M. Price Daniel, Jr., Democrat

Members

Senate

Dist. 1
 A.M. Aikin, Jr. (D), Paris

Dist. 2
 Peyton McKnight (D), Tyler

Dist. 3
 Don Adams (D), Jasper

Dist. 4
 D. Roy Harrington (D), Port Arthur

Dist. 5
 William T. "Bill" Moore (D), Bryan

Dist. 6
 Jim Wallace (D), Houston

Dist. 7
 Bob Gammage (D), Houston

Dist. 8
 O.H. "Ike" Harris (R), Dallas

Dist. 9
 Ron Clower (D), Garland

Dist. 10
 Bill Meier (D), Euless

Dist. 11
 Chet Brooks (D), Houston

Dist. 12
 Betty Andujar (R), Fort Worth

Dist. 13
 Walter Mengden (R), Houston

Dist. 14
 Charles F. Herring (D), Austin

Dist. 15
 Jack Ogg (D), Houston

Dist. 16
 Bill Braecklein (D), Dallas

Dist. 17
 A.R. "Babe" Schwartz (D), Galveston

Dist. 18
 W.N. "Bill" Patman (D), Ganado

Dist. 19
 Glenn Kothmann (D), San Antonio

Dist. 20
 Mike McKinnon (D), Corpus Christi

Dist. 21
 John Traeger (D), Seguin

Dist. 22
 Tom Creighton (D), Mineral Wells

Dist. 23
 Oscar Mauzy (D), Dallas

Dist. 24
 Grant Jones (D), Abilene

Dist. 25
 W. E. "Pete" Snelson (D), Midland

Dist. 26
 Nelson Wolff (D), San Antonio

Dist. 27
 Raul Longoria (D), Edinburg

Dist. 28
 H.J. "Doc" Blanchard (D), Lubbock

Dist. 29
 Tati Santiesteban (D), El Paso

Dist. 30
 Jack Hightower (D), Vernon

Dist. 31
 Max Sherman (D), Amarillo

House

External links

63rd Texas Legislature
1973 in Texas
1973 U.S. legislative sessions